Navarrete It is a surname of Spanish, Italian, French origin as well as Navarro

People
 Ada Navarrete (1890–1967), Mexican opera singer
 Alfonso Navarrete Prida (born 1963), Mexican politician
 Alfredo Navarrete (born 1955), Mexican footballer
 Antonio de Benavides y Fernández de Navarrete (1807–1884), Spanish politician and historian
 Antonio de Raya Navarrete (1536–1606), Spanish Roman Catholic bishop
 Armando Navarrete García (born 1980), Mexican footballer
 Bobby Navarrete, American musician, founding member (1973) of Tierra (band)
 Carlos Navarrete Cáceres (born 1931), Guatemalan anthropologist and writer
 Carlos Navarrete Ruiz (born 1955), Mexican politician
 Daniel Navarrete (model) (born 1977), Mister Venezuela 2001
 Daniel Navarrete (wrestler) (born 1963), Argentine Olympic wrestler
 Diego Bernardo de Peredo y Navarrete (1696–1774), Mexican Roman Catholic bishop
 Diego de León, 1st Count of Belascoáin, birth name Diego de León y Navarrete (1807–1841), Spanish military figure
 Domingo Fernández Navarrete (c. 1610–1689), Spanish Dominican missionary and archbishop
 Emanuel Navarrete (born 1995), Mexican world champion boxer
 Francisco Plancarte y Navarrete (1856–1920), Mexican Roman Catholic archbishop
 Gerardo Navarrete (born 1994), Chilean footballer
 Hernando Navarrete (1916–??), Colombian Olympian long-distance runner
 Ignacio María de Álava y Sáenz de Navarrete (1750–1817), Spanish naval officer
 Jacinto Navarrete (born 1962), Colombian middle-distance runner
 Javier Gómez-Navarro Navarrete (born 1945), Spanish politician 
 Javier Navarrete (born 1956), Spanish composer of film scores
 Joaquina Navarrete Contreras (born 1966), Mexican politician
 Jolette (singer), full name Jolette Guadalupe Hernández Navarrete (born 1984), Mexican singer and television presenter
 Jorge Campos Navarrete (born 1966), Mexican footballer 
 József Navarrete (born 1965), Hungarian fencer
 Juan Fernández Navarrete (1526–1579) Spanish painter
 Juan Hernández (Mexican boxer), full name Juan Hernandez Navarrete (born 1987), Mexican world champion boxer
 Juan Manuel Navarrete (born 1988), Argentine football
 Juan Pizarro Navarrete (1945–2022), Spanish physician and politician
 Julia Navarrete Guerrero (1881–1974), Mexican Roman Catholic nun, Venerable while being considered for sainthood
 Leonel Navarrete (born 1996), Mexican professional
 Luis Navarrete (born 1948), Cuban gymnast
 María Benítez Navarrete (born 1958), Mexican politician
 María Concepción Navarrete (born 1959), Mexican politician
 María Ofelia Navarrete, Salvadoran politician
 Martín Fernández de Navarrete (1765–1844), Spanish sailor and historian
 Melchor de Navarrete (1693–1761), Spanish soldier and administrator
 Miguel Elizondo Navarrete (born 1968), Mexican sprinter
 Pedro Navarrete (born 1981), Mexican zonal champion boxer
 Pete Navarrete, American musician, founding member (2000) of band Ünloco 
 Rafael Andrade Navarrete (1856–1928), Spanish politician and lawyer
 Randy Espinosa, full name Randy Navarrete Espinosa (born 1988), Guamanian footballer
 Rex Navarrete (born 1969), Filipino-American comedian
 Rolando Navarrete (born 1957), Filipino world champion boxer
 Romain Navarrete (born 1994), French rugby league player
 Segundo Navarrete (born 1985), Ecuadorian racing cyclist
 Sergio Navarrete (1925–??), Chilean alpine skier
 Tania Morgan Navarrete (born 1985), Mexican politician
 Tarcisio Navarrete (born 1954), Mexican politician and diplomat
 Tony Navarrete, American politician (first elected 2017)
 Urbano Navarrete Cortés (1920–2010), Spanish Roman Catholic Cardinal
 Ximena Navarrete (born 1988), Mexican Miss Universe 2010

See also
 Navarrete, La Rioja, a municipality in Spain
 Battle of Nájera (Battle of Navarrete), 1367 conflict in Castilian Civil War
 Navarrete (Municipio de villa Bisonó), a municipality in the Dominican Republic

Surnames of Spanish origin